The Symphony No. 4 by Walter Piston is a symphony dating from 1950.

History
Piston composed his Fourth Symphony on commission from the University of Minnesota to mark the centennial of the university's foundation in the following year. The symphony was first performed by the Minneapolis Symphony Orchestra under Antal Doráti on 30 March 1951.

Instrumentation

Piccolo
2 flutes
2 oboes
English horn
2 clarinets in B-flat
Bass clarinet
2 bassoons
Contrabassoon
4 horns in F
3 trumpets in C
3 trombones
Tuba
Timpani
Triangle
Wood block
Snare drum
Cymbals
Bass drum
2 harps
Strings

Analysis
This work, like the earlier Third and later Sixth Symphonies, is in four movements:

Piacevole ( = 84)
Ballando ( = 132)
Contemplativo ( = 92)
Energico ( = 120)

A typical performance will last around 25 minutes.

The first movement begins with a flowing, two-octave melody in the violins, countered by a chromatic theme in the clarinet. The second movement is a "dancing" movement in rondo form, featuring irregular meters (3/4, 7/8, 5/8, 2/4, etc.), alternating with a 6/8 waltz and a vigorous theme "reminiscent of country fiddling". The contemplativo grows from an almost completely atonal opening theme into an explosive climax. The finale is in sonata form, with the first theme strongly rhythmic, and the second (in the oboe) more cantabile. The development section is short, and leads through a return of the second theme in the violins to an exuberant ending built on the first theme.

References

Further reading
Austin, William. 1955. "Piston's Fourth Symphony: An Analysis". Music Review 16:120–37.
Ferguson, Donald Nivison. 1954. "Piston". In his Masterworks of the Orchestral Repertoire: A Guide for Listeners, 418–21. Minneapolis: University of Minnesota Press.

Symphony No. 4
1950 compositions